Çuxanlı (also, Chukhanly) is a village and municipality in the Gobustan Rayon of Azerbaijan.  Çuxanlı has a population of 757.

References 

Populated places in Gobustan District